The 1974 Ulster Unionist Party leadership election took place on 22 January 1974, as a result of incumbent Brian Faulkner's resignation on 7 January 1974 because of difficulty in achieving agreement to the setting up of an all-Ireland council. The election resulted in Harry West succeeding Faulkner as Leader of the UUP.

Notes

 

Ulster Unionist Party leadership elections
1974 elections in the United Kingdom
1974 elections in Northern Ireland
Ulster Unionist Party leadership election